The 1991 Harvard Crimson football team was an American football team that represented Harvard University during the 1991 NCAA Division I-AA football season. Harvard finished third in the Ivy League.

In their 21st year under head coach Joe Restic, the Crimson compiled a 4–5–1 record and were outscored 223 to 203. John Lausch was the team captain.

Harvard's 4–2–1 conference record placed third in the Ivy League standings. The Crimson outscored Ivy opponents 163 to 160.

Harvard played its home games at Harvard Stadium in the Allston neighborhood of Boston, Massachusetts.

Schedule

References

Harvard
Harvard Crimson football seasons
Harvard Crimson football
Harvard Crimson football